Mount Royal is an area of Calgary, Alberta and is home to the neighbourhoods of Upper Mount Royal (to the south) and Lower Mount Royal (the northern section, on flat terrain), which are separated by an escarpment that runs along Cameron and Royal Avenues in an east-west direction. Upper Mount Royal has an area redevelopment plan in place.

Upper Mount Royal (along with Elbow Park and Roxboro) is one of Calgary's wealthiest neighbourhoods and is home to some of the city's most expensive estates ranging in age from nearly 100 years old to new. Originally an enclave of the city's American born business elite, the neighbourhood was originally known as 'American hill'. As of 2001, American immigrants still made up 29.2% of the residents. This informal name eventually gave way to the more Canadian name of Mount Royal.  These neighbourhoods are concentrated in the Elbow River valley. The area of both neighbourhoods is bounded on the north by 17th Avenue SW and on the west by 14th Street SW.

Despite its name, Mount Royal is not home to the city's Mount Royal University.

Demographics

It is represented in the Calgary City Council by the Ward 8 councillor, on a provincial level by Calgary-Elbow MLA Doug Schweitzer, and at federal level by Calgary Centre MP Greg McLean.

Residents of Upper Mount Royal had a median household income of $127,135 in 2000, while those in Lower Mount Royal made far less at an average of $35,570. 11.7%% and 26.7% low-income residents live in Upper and Lower Mount Royal respectively. While the majority of buildings in Upper Mount Royal (87.2%) are single-family detached homes, in Lower Mount Royal condominiums and apartment buildings are prevailing at 88.7%, with 77.5% used for renting in 2001.

Education
The community is served by Earl Grey Elementary School, William Reid Elementary School, Mount Royal Junior High and Western Canada High School.

Notable residents
Charlene Prickett: "It Figures" exercise host and Calgary television personality from the late 1970s to the 1990s; member of the Mount Royal Community Association

See also
List of neighbourhoods in Calgary

References

External links
Mount Royal Community Association

Neighbourhoods in Calgary